Apamea scoparia is a moth of the family Noctuidae first described by Kauri Mikkola, Tomas Mustelin and J. Donald Lafontaine in 2000. It is one of the most common and widespread North American Apamea, being distributed from Newfoundland and Labrador to Alaska and British Columbia, and south to California and Arizona.

The moth is dull brick red. The glandular coremata produce a scent described as "somewhere between vinegar and carrots".

References

Apamea (moth)
Moths described in 2000
Moths of North America